This list is of deserted medieval villages (DMVs), "shrunken" villages and other settlements known to have been "lost" or significantly reduced in size over the centuries. There are estimated to be as many as 3,000 DMVs in England alone. (Grid references are given, where known.)
Achurch
Althorp 
Appletree
Armston
Astwell
Astwick
Badsaddle 
Barford 
Boughton 
Braunston Cleves or Fawcliff 
Braunstonbury 
Brime
Brockhall
Burghley
Calme
Caswell
Canons Ashby (Ascebi) 
Cotes
Coton 
Cotton near Grendon 
Cotton Mill
Cotton Mallows
Chilcote 
Churchfield
Church Charwelton 
Doddington Thorpe 
Downtown 
Eaglethorpe
Eastern Neston
Edgcote
Elmington in Ashton
Elmington in Tansor
Elkington 
Falcutt
Fawsley 
Foscote
Faxton 
Field Burcote
Foxley
Furtho
Glassthorpe 
Glendon 
Great Purston
Hale
Holdenby 
Horton 
Hothorpe 
Kelmarsh 
Kingsthorpe
Kirby 
Kirby in Blakesley
Kirby in Gretton
Knuston 
Lilford
Little Creaton 
Little Newton 
Little Oxendon 
Lolham
Lower Catesby 
Mawsley 
Milton
Murcott 
Muscott 
Nether Catesby
Newbottle 
Newbottle in Harrington
Nobold 
Nobottle
Nunton
Papley
Perio
Pipewell 
Potcote
Preston Deanery 
Onley 
Overstone 
Rushton Saint Peter 
Seawell
Sibberton
Silsworth 
Snorscomb 
Stanford 
Steane
Strixton 
Stuchbury
Sulby 
Thorpe 
Thorpe Lubenham
Thrupp 
Torpel
Trafford
Upper Catesby 
Upton
Walcot
Walton
Winwick 
Wolfhampcote 
Woodcroft
Wothorpe
Wythmail

References

 
 
Lost settlements